Hullo Marmaduke is a 1924 Australian film comedy drama from director Beaumont Smith about a naive Englishman (Claude Dampier) who comes to Australia as a remittance man. It is considered a lost film.

Plot
Marmaduke (Claude Dampier) is the youngest son of a noble English family who is sent out to Australia on the RMS Osterley with his faithful valet Huggett (Jimmy Taylor). At Fremantle he is swindled by two card sharps out of most of his money. He then goes to Adelaide and makes his way to the gold fields. On the voyage he meets up with barmaid Mrs Mary Morton (Constance Graham) and her young daughter Margie who are looking for Mary's husband Mike (Mayne Lynton). Mrs Morton is killed by some burglars, including her husband, and with her dying breath asks Maramduke to look after her daughter. Marmaduke makes a fortune prospecting, spends the money on Margie and falls in love with her as Margie grows up (Lucille Lisle). Margie is taken prisoner by a lunatic who puts her on board a ship and threatens to blow her up. Marmaduke comes to the rescue, then sees her marry a wealthy suitor.

Cast
Claude Dampier as Marmaduke
Mayne Lynton as Mike Morton
Jimmy Taylor as Huggett
Constance Graham as Mary Morton
Grafton Williáms as Squid Squires
Fernande Butler
Lucille Lisle as Margie

Production
This was the first film of Claude Dampier, a popular stage and vaudeville comedian. The climax featured the scuttling of the battlecruiser  outside Sydney heads in April 1924. Actual production on the film did not begin until September, however. Interior shooting took place at Australasian Films' studio at Rushcutter's Bay  with exterior  filming  undertaken at Sydney's Domain,  The Spit, Newport, Cockatoo Island, the Wentworth Hotel, Potts Point, Balgowlah and the Woolloomooloo wharves among other Sydney locations. Some scenes were also shot aboard the Osterley.  Location filming continued into October. Two of the principal cast members, Jimmy Taylor and Grafton Williams had previous film experience in South Africa. Taylor was also a member of Dampier's Trump Cards Revue Company.

Reception
The film was well promoted and proved popular with the public. Smith and Dampier later made The Adventures of Algy (1925) together.

References

External links
Hullo Marmaduke in the Internet Movie Database
Hullo Marmaduke at the National Film and Sound Archive

1924 films
Lost Australian films
Films directed by Beaumont Smith
Remittance men
Australian silent feature films
Australian black-and-white films
Australian comedy-drama films
1924 comedy-drama films
Silent comedy-drama films
1924 lost films